Operation Cartwheel (1943–1944) was a major military operation for the Allies in the Pacific theatre of World War II. Cartwheel was an operation aimed at neutralising the major Japanese base at Rabaul. The operation was directed by the Supreme Allied Commander in the South West Pacific Area (SWPA), General Douglas MacArthur, whose forces had advanced along the northeast coast of New Guinea and occupied nearby islands. Allied forces from the South Pacific Area, under Admiral William Halsey, advanced through the Solomon Islands toward Bougainville. The Allied forces involved were from Australia, the Netherlands, New Zealand, the US and various Pacific Islands.

Background

Japanese forces had captured Rabaul, on New Britain, in the Territory of New Guinea, from Australian forces in February 1942 and turned it into their major forward base in the South Pacific, and the main obstacle in the two Allied theatres. MacArthur formulated a strategic outline, the Elkton Plan, to capture Rabaul from bases in Australia and New Guinea. Admiral Ernest J. King, the Chief of Naval Operations, proposed a plan with similar elements but under Navy command. Army Chief of Staff George C. Marshall, whose main goal was for the US to concentrate its efforts against Nazi Germany in Europe and not against the Japanese in the Pacific, proposed a compromise plan in which the task would be divided into three stages, the first under Navy command and the other two under MacArthur's direction and the control of the Army. This strategic plan, which was never formally adopted by the US Joint Chiefs of Staff but was ultimately implemented, called for the following:
Capturing Tulagi (later Guadalcanal) and the Santa Cruz Islands (Operation Watchtower)
Capturing the northeastern coast of New Guinea and the central Solomons
Reducing Rabaul and related bases

The protracted battle for Guadalcanal, followed by the unopposed seizure of the Russell Islands (Operation Cleanslate) on 21 February 1943, resulted in Japanese attempts to reinforce the area by sea. MacArthur's air forces countered in the Battle of the Bismarck Sea from 2–5 March 1943. The disastrous losses suffered by the Japanese prompted Admiral Isoroku Yamamoto to initiate Operation I-Go, a series of air attacks against Allied airfields and shipping at both Guadalcanal and New Guinea, which ultimately resulted in his death, on 18 April 1943.

Implementation

MacArthur had presented Elkton III, his revised plan for taking Rabaul before 1944, on 12 February 1943. It called for him to attack northeastern New Guinea and western New Britain and for Admiral William F. Halsey Jr., then in command of the South Pacific Area, to attack the central Solomons. The plan required seven more divisions than were already in the theatre, which raised objections from the British. The Joint Chiefs responded with a directive that approved the plan if forces already in the theatre or en route were used and the implementation was delayed by 60 days. Elkton III then became Operation Cartwheel.

Operations

Cartwheel identified 13 proposed subordinate operations and set a timetable for their launching. Of the 13, Rabaul, Kavieng, and Kolombangara were eventually eliminated as too costly and unnecessary, and only 11 were actually undertaken (the Green Islands, only 117 miles from Rabaul, were substituted for Kavieng):

Operation Chronicle – 30 June 1943
Woodlark Island (112th Cavalry Regiment)
Kiriwina (158th Regimental Combat Team RCT US)
Operation Toenails – 30 June 1943
New Georgia (43d Infantry Division US) – 30 June 1943
Segi Point, New Georgia (4th Marine Raider Battalion US) – 21 June 1943
Rendova (169th and 172nd RCT's US) – 30 June 1943
Zanana, New Georgia (169th and 172nd RCT's US) – 5 July 1943
Bairoko, New Georgia (4th Marine Raider Battalion US) – 5 July 1943
Arundel Island (172nd RCT, 43rd Infantry Division US) – 27 August 1943
Vella Lavella (35th RCT, 25th Infantry Division US, 3rd Division New Zealand) –  15 August 1943
Operation Postern – 5 September 1943
Lae, New Guinea (9th and 7th Division Australia, 503rd Parachute Infantry Regiment US)
Operation Goodtime – 27 October 1943
Treasury Islands (8th Brigade New Zealand)
Operation Blissful – 28 October 1943
Choiseul Island (2nd Marine Parachute Battalion US)
Operation Cherryblossom  – 1 November 1943
Bougainville (3d Marine Division US, 37th Infantry Division US)
Operation Dexterity
Arawe, New Britain (112th Cavalry US) – 15 December 1943
Cape Gloucester (1st Marine Division US) – 26 December 1943
Saidor (32nd Infantry Division US) – 2 January 1944
Green Islands - 15 February 1944 (3rd Division New Zealand)
Admiralty Islands – 29 February 1944 (1st Cavalry Division US)
Emirau Island – 20 March 1944 (4th Marine Regiment US)

The New Guinea Force, under General Thomas Blamey, was assigned responsibility for the eastward thrusts on mainland New Guinea. The US 6th Army, under General Walter Krueger, was to take Kiriwina, Woodlark, and Cape Gloucester. The land forces would be supported by Allied air units under Lieutenant General George Kenney and naval units under Vice Admiral Arthur S. Carpender.

In the midst of Operation Cartwheel, the Joint Chiefs met with President Franklin Roosevelt and British Prime Minister Winston Churchill at the Quadrant Conference in Quebec City in August 1943. There, the decision was made to bypass and isolate Rabaul, rather than attempting to capture the base, and to attack Kavieng instead. Soon afterward, the decision was made to bypass Kavieng as well. Although initially objected to by MacArthur, the bypassing of Rabaul, instead of its neutralisation, meant that his Elkton plan had been achieved, and after invading Saidor, he then moved into his Reno Plan, an advance across the north coast of New Guinea to Mindanao.

The campaign, which stretched into 1944, showed the effectiveness of a strategy of avoiding major concentrations of enemy forces and instead aiming to sever the Japanese lines of supply and communication.

Neutralisation of Rabaul

The Japanese Navy decided to try to save Rabaul by sending hundreds of airplanes from aircraft carriers based at Truk in December 1943 to counter the U.S. and Australian bombers. But the only thing that this operation accomplished was the destruction of 200–300 of their own irreplaceable carrier planes and the loss of experienced naval aviators. This degradation of the Japanese aircraft carrier air fleet led to preparations by the U.S. Navy to start the Marianas campaign a few months later. Also, the Admiralty Islands campaign was conducted starting in late February after the Allies confirmed that Rabaul no longer had any airplanes.

By February 1944 Rabaul had no more fighters or bombers for the rest of the war due to the non-stop bombing by land-based Allied airplanes only a few hundred miles from Rabaul after most of Operation Cartwheel was completed. 120 airplanes were evacuated to Truk on 19 February in an attempt to replace the destroyed Navy carrier airplanes. Rabaul became a de facto prisoner of war camp.

References

Sources

Official histories
Australia
 The New Guinea Offensives (Army)
 Royal Australian Navy, 1942–1945
 Air War Against Japan, 1943–1945 (RAAF)

New Zealand
 The Pacific

United States

External links

The History Channel, June 30 — 1943 Operation Cartwheel is launched (2005)
David Horner, "Strategy and Command in Australia’s New Guinea Campaigns" (2004)
An Animated History of Operation Cartwheel (2006) 
 Brief synopsis of Allied campaign to isolate Rabaul.
 Brief account of Japanese occupation of Rabaul and subsequent war crimes trials of many of the Japanese troops who had been stationed there.
 Account of US Marine involvement in air war over Solomon Islands and Rabaul.
 Information on "Pappy" Boyington

 
South West Pacific theatre of World War II
British Solomon Islands
Territory of New Guinea
Conflicts in 1943
Conflicts in 1944
Battles and operations of World War II involving the Solomon Islands
Battles and operations of World War II involving Papua New Guinea
1943 in Papua New Guinea
1944 in Papua New Guinea
1943 in the Solomon Islands
1944 in the Solomon Islands
Battles of World War II involving Australia
Battles of World War II involving the United States
United States Marine Corps in World War II